Otter Lake is a lake in northwestern Kenora District in northwestern Ontario, Canada. It is in the Hudson Bay drainage basin and is the source of the Otter River. The Otter River flows via the Fawn River and Severn River to Hudson Bay.

Otter Lake is immediately southeast of Angling Lake, the home of the Wapekeka First Nation and location of Angling Lake/Wapekeka Airport.

See also
List of lakes in Ontario

References

Other map sources:

Lakes of Kenora District